Albin B. Swindell House and Store is a historic home and general merchandise store located at Swindell Fork, Hyde County, North Carolina. The store was established in 1875, and originally operated out of a barn.  It moved to its current building in 1890.  The store building also housed a post office and an early telephone. The house was enlarged to two stories in 1903, at which time the contributing smokehouse and pumphouse were constructed.

It was added to the National Register of Historic Places in 1986.

References

Houses on the National Register of Historic Places in North Carolina
Commercial buildings on the National Register of Historic Places in North Carolina
1875 establishments in North Carolina
Commercial buildings completed in 1890
Houses completed in 1903
Houses in Hyde County, North Carolina
National Register of Historic Places in Hyde County, North Carolina